Fairground Attraction was a London based folk and soft rock band. They are  notable for the 1988 hit songs "Perfect" and "Find My Love", both taken from the group's multi-platinum selling debut album, The First of a Million Kisses. The band won two Brit Awards in 1989, but split the following year. Lead vocalist Eddi Reader subsequently launched a solo career.

Career
Fairground Attraction were put together in London by guitarist and songwriter Mark Nevin, who had previously played with Kirsty McColl. After meeting Scottish singer Eddi Reader they played small venues in London with band members Simon Edward and Roy Dodds. In 1987, RCA Records signed Fairground Attraction, and in April 1988 released their first single, "Perfect", an immediate success, reaching number one on the UK Singles Chart. In May 1988, RCA released their album The First of a Million Kisses, a blend of folk, jazz, country, and cajun elements (with all but one of its songs written by guitarist Mark Nevin). The album duplicated the success of "Perfect". After entering the UK Albums Chart at number three, and rising to number two, it was eventually certified platinum. RCA released three other singles from the album: "Find My Love" (which reached number seven on the UK Singles Chart), "A Smile in a Whisper", and "Clare".

At the 1989 BRIT Awards, "Perfect" won the award for Best British Single, and The First of a Million Kisses won the award for Best British Album.

Although they were popular in European countries, and toured the United States, they found their main success outside the UK in Japan, where they toured in 1989.

In September 1989, during the recording of a second album, rumours of arguments circulated, and in January 1990 the band split up. Reader and Nevin have both been interviewed about the break up but do not agree on what actually prompted it. RCA later released a second album "Ay Fond Kiss" and one of its songs, a cover of Patsy Cline's "Walkin' After Midnight", was their last single and a minor hit. This album though was made up of B-sides and other material recorded alongside their first album (many being collaborations by just two band members). Mark Nevin recorded material intended for the second album with Brian Kennedy, released under the name Sweetmouth in 1991.

A live recording of Fairground Attraction from 1989 was later released and as well as hits and tracks from their first album it included eight tracks intended for the aborted second album. This release came in 2003 and documents a show from their Japanese tour, Kawasaki Live in Japan 02.07.89.

After the band's break-up, Eddi Reader continued to perform as a solo artist. Mark Nevin worked with Morrissey, co-writing most of the Kill Uncle album, and with Kirsty MacColl again, before embarking on his own solo career.

Although Reader and Nevin have occasionally worked together over the years, they seem uninterested in reforming the band.

Personnel
Eddi Reader – vocals
Mark E. Nevin – electric and acoustic guitars
Simon Edwards – guitarrón
Roy Dodds – drums

Awards and nominations
{| class=wikitable
|-
! Year !! Awards !! Work!! Category !! Result
|-
| 1988
| Smash Hits Poll Winners Party
| rowspan=2|Themselves 
| Most Promising New Act 
| 
|-
| rowspan=4|1989
| Silver Clef Award 
| Best Newcomer
| 
|-
| Ivor Novello Awards
| rowspan=2|"Perfect"
| Best Song Musically & Lyrically
| 
|-
| rowspan=2|BRIT Awards
| Best British Single
| 
|-
| The First of a Million Kisses
| Best British Album
|

Discography

Studio albums

Compilation albums
The Collection: Fairground Attraction, featuring Eddi Reader (1994)
Perfect: The Best of Fairground Attraction (1995)
The Very Best of Fairground Attraction, featuring Eddi Reader (1996)
The Masters (1997)
80s Eternal Best: Fairground Attraction Best (1998)
The Very Best of Fairground Attraction (2004)

Live albums
Kawasaki Live in Japan 02.07.89 (2003)

Singles

Videos
The First of a Million Kisses (1990)
Collection of music videos: "Perfect", "Find My Love", "A Smile in a Whisper", "Clare"
Live at Full House (1990)
Live performances from German television show called Live at Full House:

References

External links
Eddi Reader's official website
Mark E. Nevin's website

British folk music groups
British soft rock music groups
Female-fronted musical groups
Musical groups established in 1987
Musical groups disestablished in 1990
Musical groups from London
Brit Award winners
RCA Records artists